The Piano Trio No. 3 in C minor, Op. 101, by Johannes Brahms is scored for piano, violin and cello, and was written in the summer of 1886 while Brahms was on holiday in Hofstetten, Switzerland. It was premiered on 20 December of that year by Brahms, violinist Jenő Hubay, and cellist David Popper.

Structure 

The trio is in four movements:

References

External links
 
 Performance of Piano Trio No. 3 by the Claremont Trio from the Isabella Stewart Gardner Museum in MP3 format
 Detailed Listening Guide using the recording by Trio Opus 8

Piano trios by Johannes Brahms
1886 compositions
Compositions in C minor